Epyaxa venipunctata is a species of moth in the family Geometridae. It is endemic to New Zealand. This species was first described by Francis Walker in 1863.

References

Xanthorhoini
Moths of New Zealand
Endemic fauna of New Zealand
Taxa named by Francis Walker (entomologist)
Moths described in 1863
Endemic moths of New Zealand